Ptychoparioidea is a superfamily of the Ptychopariida order of trilobites.

Taxonomy

Family Acrocephalitidae 
Family Alokistocaridae
Family Antagmidae
Family Asaphiscidae 
Family Atopidae
Family Bolaspididae 
Family Cedariidae 
Family Changshaniidae 
Family Conocoryphidae 
Family Conokephalinidae 
Family Crepicephalidae 
Family Diceratocephalidae 
Family Elviniidae 
Family Eulomidae 
Family Holocephalinidae 
Family Ignotogregatidae 
Family Inouyiidae
Family Isocolidae 
Family Kingstoniidae 
Family Liostracinidae 
Family Llanoaspididae 
Family Lonchocephalidae 
Family Lorenzellidae 
Family Mapaniidae 
Family Marjumiidae 
Family Menomoniidae 
Family Nepeidae 
Family Norwoodiidae 
Family Papyriaspididae 
Family Phylacteridae 
Family Proasaphiscidae 
Family Ptychopariidae 
Family Shumardiidae 
Family Solenopleuridae 
Family Tricrepicephalidae 
Family Utiidae 
Family Wuaniidae

References 

Ptychoparioidea
Cambrian trilobites
Arthropod superfamilies